Salvador Padilla (September 19, 1924 – July 21, 2010), was a Puerto Rican politician who served as Puerto Rico Governor Rafael Hernandez Colon's last Secretary of State of Puerto Rico from January 1992 to January 2, 1993. Padilla Escabi studied in the school's public system and then earned a BA in agriculture and mechanical arts from the University of Puerto Rico. He then graduated from the University of Cornell and in 1958 is the first Puerto Rican to get a PhD in planning. Salvador Padilla began his military career in the United States Army Reserve in 1942 making it to the rank of Sergeant. He earned his commission as a 2nd lieutenant via the Army Officer Candidate School at Fort Benning, Georgia. He also served as Puerto Rico Adjutant General of the Puerto Rico National Guard. Mayor General Salvador M. Padilla Escabi was the founder of the Language Center at Fort Allen, Puerto Rico. He died on July 21, 2010 in Hato Rey, Puerto Rico.

Professionally, General Padilla was an engineer and planner. He was the author of several planning studies relating to Puerto Rico.

Death
Salvador M. Padilla Escabi died on July 21, 2010 in Hato Rey, Puerto Rico, at age 85. He was buried at San Miguel Arcangel Cemetery, in Cabo Rojo, Puerto Rico.

Legacy
In 2011 the Armed Forces Reserve Center at Fort Allen, Puerto Rico was inaugurated and dedicated posthumously as Mayor General Salvador M. Padilla Escabi Armed Forces Reserve Center.

He was inducted to the United States Army Officer Candidate School Alumni Association Hall of Fame.

Publications
•Air rights : potencial uses of air space in Puerto Rico above and below public transportation routes
by Salvador M. Padilla y Asociados.
San Juan, P.R. : Dept. of Transportation and Public Works, 1975.

•San Juan Metropolitan Area Transportation Study : highway plan update 1995
by Salvador M. Padilla y Asociados.
San Juan, Puerto Rico : Puerto Rico Highway Authority, 1975.

•Isla Mona land use schemes for the petroleum base project
by Salvador M. Padilla y Asociados.
Hato Rey, P.R. : SMP, 1974.

•A general neighborhood renewal plan for the eastern central area of Mayagüez, Puerto Rico
by Puerto Rico. Administración de Renovación Urbana y Vivienda.
Río Piedras, P.R. : The Administration, 1965.

•A general neighborhood renewal plan for the eastern central area of Mayagüez, Puerto Rico
by Puerto Rico. Departamento de la Vivienda.
Río Piedras, P.R. : The Administration, 1965.

Sources
http://hip.upr.edu:85/ipac20/ipac.jsp?session=1279Q3HJ90390.62017&profile=de&uri=link=3100006~!149388~!3100001~!3100002&aspect=subtab229&menu=search&ri=3&source=~!uprbib&term=Salvador+M.+Padilla+y+Asociados.&index=AUTHOR

1924 births
2010 deaths
Cornell University alumni
National Guard (United States) generals
People from Cabo Rojo, Puerto Rico
20th-century Puerto Rican engineers
Puerto Rican military officers
Puerto Rico Adjutant Generals
Secretaries of State of Puerto Rico
United States Army generals
United States Army reservists
University of Puerto Rico alumni
Puerto Rico National Guard personnel